Otostigmus politus is a species of centipede in the Scolopendridae family. It is found in Australia and Melanesia, and was first described in 1881 by German arachnologist Ferdinand Karsch.

Distribution
The species occurs in northern and eastern coastal Queensland as well as in New Guinea and the Solomon Islands.

Behaviour
The centipedes are solitary terrestrial predators that inhabit plant litter, soil and rotting wood.

References

 

 
politus
Centipedes of Australia
Fauna of Queensland
Arthropods of New Guinea
Fauna of the Solomon Islands
Animals described in 1881
Taxa named by Ferdinand Karsch